SVN or svn may refer to:

 SVN, former NYSE ticker symbol for 7 Days Inn, a Chinese budget hotel chain
 SVN, abbreviation for Apache Subversion, a software versioning and revision control system
 SVN-98, alternate designation for the KSVK 12.7, a Russian sniper rifle
 SVN, ISO 3166-1 alpha-3 country code for Slovenia 
 Social Venture Network, a social responsibility network
 South Vietnam, a former state
 Space Vehicle Number, a number given out in launch sequence to Navstar Global Positioning System satellites
 State of Vietnam, a former state of the French Union
 Student Video Network, former name of CoogTV, a student-operated television station at the University of Houston
 Sri Vivekanand Niji University (Swami Vivekanand University, Madhya Pradesh), a university in Madhya Pradesh, India